Harrods Christmas bears are signature plush toy bears created by the London department store Harrods and released every year to celebrate Christmas. They have been a tradition since 1986, and past bears are now considered valuable collectors’ items. Harrods bears can be recognised by a mark on their left paw, which shows the Harrods logo and the year they were released.

The first Harrods Christmas Bear 
Snowy, the first Harrods Christmas bear, appeared in 1986 wearing a knitted hat and scarf. This first bear was the only one not to have the distinguishable logo and year on his left paw, and he originally sold at a price of £14.95. He was reproduced in 1995 – this time with the logo and the date, 1986, on his paw. Original, undated bears are incredibly hard to find (reputedly, even the Harrods archive does not have one) and can sell for upwards of £600.

Since 1986, a bear has been released every year released in time for Christmas. Each bear wears a different outfit and care is taken to ensure that each year's bear is different to those from previous years. In the early years, the bears did not have names. The first named bear, William, was released in 2003. Since then, every bear released has his own name which is decided from a shortlist and is accompanied by a tag telling his story. As the popularity of the bears grew, consumer demand led to all bears from before 2003 being retroactively given names

References 

1999 James 
2000 Merlin
2021 Scot
2002 Giles
2003 William
2004 Thomas
2005 Nicholas
2006 Alexander
2007 Benjamin
2008 Oscar

Harrods
Teddy bears
Toy collecting
Toy brands
Products introduced in 1986